Maurilio Giannotti (died 1505) was a Roman Catholic prelate who served as Bishop of Calvi Risorta (1495–1505).

In 1495, Maurilio Giannotti was appointed by Pope Alexander VI as Bishop of Calvi Risorta. He served as Bishop of Calvi Risorta until his death in 1505.

References

External links and additional sources
 (for Chronology of Bishops) 
 (for Chronology of Bishops) 

16th-century Italian Roman Catholic bishops
1505 deaths
Bishops appointed by Pope Alexander VI